Pontus Eklöf (born January 2, 1998) is a Swedish ice hockey player. He previously played with Linköpings HC of the Swedish Hockey League (SHL).

Career
Born in Linköping, Sweden, Eklöf played junior hockey with local team Linköpings HC. In 2012–13, he debuted at the under-16 level, playing twelve games in the J16 Elit. The following season he played in ten U-18 games.  That same year, he also competed with a regional all-star team from Östergötland in the annual TV-pucken, an under-15 national tournament, and recorded two goals and five assists over eight games. In 2015–16, Eklöf played twenty one games with Linköpings HC's J20 SuperElit team. After impressive performances in the youth ranks, Eklöf made his Swedish Hockey League debut against Brynäs IF.

Career statistics

Regular season and playoffs

References

External links

1998 births
Living people
Swedish ice hockey forwards
Sportspeople from Linköping
Linköping HC players